Sisingamangaraja XII International Airport  is an international airport located in Silangit, North Tapanuli, North Sumatra, Indonesia. The airport was known as Silangit International Airport, and was later named after Batak warrior and King Sisingamangaraja XII (1849–1907) in 2018.

The airport serves as the main gateway to the nearby Lake Toba as well as the surrounding area. The airport is aimed at increasing air connectivity to support economic and tourism growth at this lake, which was included in Indonesia's 10 new emerging destinations. Passengers can use online-enabled transportation like Grab to connect to nearby towns. The airport was named as the best airport in Asia-Pacific in 2020 (under 2 million passengers per annum) by Airports Council International.

History
Silangit Airport was originally built during the Japanese occupation era. The development of this airport began in 1995 by extending the runway from the original 900 meters to 1,400 meters. In March 2005, President Susilo Bambang Yudhoyono inaugurated the operation of Silangit Airport. Since then, the airport started developing rapidly. In 2011, the airport eventually had a 2,400 meter runway, which again extended in 2015 to 2,650 meter (8,700 × 150 ft) to accommodate wide-bodied airplanes on a regular basis. The airport became an international airport on 28 October 2017 with the first charter flight to Singapore, operated by Garuda Indonesia.

Development
Due to an increase in tourism growth, the government has upgraded the airport's facilities, such as building a new terminal, lengthening the runway and widening the apron. With the inauguration of the well equipped and modern terminal on 15 September 2017, the airport can provide a more comfortable environment for its passengers. The development of the airport also involves the expansion of the terminal from a capacity of 36,500 passengers per year to 1 million passengers per year. The airport’s passenger terminal encompasses an area of 500 square meters and will be expanded to 1,700 m2. The new terminal also includes several new installations that did not exist in the old terminal, such as Customs, Immigration and Quarantine. This was done so that the airport can serve international flights beginning in the subsequent year.

Developments to the Medan-Tebing Tinggi-Parapat toll road are also undergoing, easing access to the airport. The development of the Siantar-Danau Toba railway was expected be fully operational in 2019. This was expected to cut the trip from Medan to Parapat to 3.5 hours.

Facilities
The airport has full digital based services, which includes digital airport bus schedules, e-payment systems, a wifi.id corner and smart baggage claim – a facility to monitor the position of passengers' baggage. The airport is also equipped with tourism information kiosks that give a wide range of information about activities in the nearby area.

Runway

Airlines and destinations

Statistics

References

Airports in North Sumatra